Sevenia silvicola is a butterfly in the family Nymphalidae. It is found in Cameroon.

References

Endemic fauna of Cameroon
Butterflies described in 1917
silvicola
Butterflies of Africa